Pupina brenchleyi is a species of land snail with an operculum, a terrestrial gastropod mollusk in the family Pupinidae. This species is endemic to Micronesia.

References 

Fauna of Micronesia
Pupina
Gastropods described in 1862
Taxonomy articles created by Polbot